Gracilibacillus ureilyticus is a Gram-positive, halotolerant, neutrophilic, rod-shaped bacterium. MF38T (=CGMCC 1.7727T =JCM 15711T) is its type strain.

References

Further reading
Whitman, William B., et al., eds. Bergey's manual of systematic bacteriology. Vol. 3. Springer, 2012.
Logan, Niall A., and Paul De Vos, eds. Endospore-forming soil bacteria. Vol. 27. Springer, 2011.

External links

LPSN
Type strain of Gracilibacillus ureilyticus at BacDive -  the Bacterial Diversity Metadatabase

Bacillaceae
Bacteria described in 2010